Comedy Central is a channel available in Spain through satellite platform Digital+, ADSL TV Movistar TV, Orange TV and cable services. It is owned by Paramount Global.
Comedy Central was launched in March 1999. Originally, it shared the dial with corporate sibling Nickelodeon, but later the two separated in February 2005. It broadcasts a mixture of comedy series (both Spanish and international) and original programming with Spanish comedians.

The original programming is produced under the umbrella of the Nuevos Cómicos (new comedians) program. The original Nuevos Cómicos program is a stand up comedy program, whose comedians also make theater performance tours since 2001. Some of them are Joaquín Reyes, Carlos Clavijo, Alejandro Angelini, Belén Rubio, Ernesto Sevilla, Diego Wainstein, Micky McPhantom, Juan Diego Martín, Raúl Cimas, Carlos Ramos, Ignatius, Don Mauro, Ricardo Castella, Alex O´Dogherty, Julián López, Dani Mateo, Sandra Marchena, Velilla Valbuena and Ángel Martín.

Other programs developed from comedians who started in Nuevos Cómicos are the sketch program La hora Chanante and late night shows Noche sin tregua and Nada Que Perder. In 2009, the channel got a new logo, which is similar to the previous Comedy Central logo. In 2014 the channel made a rebranding. Its name (which was Paramount Channel) changed to Comedy Central. The logotype also was changed.

Roasts 

In May 2014, when Paramount Channel was rebranded Comedy Central the first televised roast in Spain was broadcast. The roast was recorded one month earlier in the Teatro Calderón theatre in Madrid. El Terrat produced the two roasts made to this date

External links
 Comedy Central website

Television stations in Spain
Television in Andorra
Comedy Central